Beatogordius is a genus of worms belonging to the family Chordodidae.

The species of this genus are found in Australia.

Species:

Beatogordius abaiconus 
Beatogordius abbreviatus 
Beatogordius alfredi 
Beatogordius australiensis 
Beatogordius brieni 
Beatogordius deshayesi 
Beatogordius echinatus 
Beatogordius erythraeus 
Beatogordius funis 
Beatogordius inesae 
Beatogordius irregularis 
Beatogordius latastei 
Beatogordius lineatus 
Beatogordius nagalandis 
Beatogordius palustre 
Beatogordius raphaelis 
Beatogordius regularis 
Beatogordius sankurensis 
Beatogordius ugandensis 
Beatogordius variabilis 
Beatogordius wilsoni

References

Nematomorpha